Marshall Barer (born Marshall Louis Barer; February 19, 1923 in Astoria, Queens – August 25, 1998 in Santa Fe, New Mexico) was a lyricist, librettist, singer, songwriter and director.

Early career 
Barer began his career as a lyricist and songwriter in the late 1940s while working as a commercial artist/designer in New York. His most-heard song is the Mighty Mouse theme song.

Career 
He had his greatest Broadway success came in 1959 with Once Upon a Mattress, for which he was lyricist and a book writer.

In 1972 he wrote 7 songs for Scarecrow in a Garden of Cucumbers, a low-budget movie starring Holly Woodlawn.

Death 
Marshall died aged 75 in Santa Fe, New Mexico, at his home, after living many years in Venice, California.

Popular songs

River Run
La Ronde (This Is Quite a Perfect Night)
Scratch My Back
Roller Coaster Blues
Intoxication
In a Little While
Shy
Normandy
Very Soft Shoes
Song of Love (I'm In Love With A Girl Named Fred)
Christmas long Ago
What'll I Do With All the Love I Was Savin' for You?
Warm Winter
On Such A Night As This

Musicals/stage

Walk Tall (1954)
New Faces of 1956 (1956)
Ziegfeld Follies (1957 starring Beatrice Lillie)
Once Upon a Mattress (1959)
Dancing on the Air (an adaptation of Shaw's The Devil's Disciple) with Dean Fuller
Around the World in Eighty Days with music by Michel Legrand
A Little Night Music (never produced)

External links
 Obituary, The independent
 Obituary, The Big Bands Database
 Unofficial site about Lorenz Hart and Marshall Barer

1923 births
1998 deaths
20th-century American composers
American musical theatre composers
Broadway composers and lyricists
Jewish American composers
Jewish American songwriters
LGBT composers
Male musical theatre composers
People from Astoria, Queens
20th-century American Jews
20th-century American LGBT people